Seka is a town in south-eastern Ethiopia.

Transport 
It is planned that this town will receive a railway station on the new Ethiopian Railway system.

See also 
 List of cities and towns in Ethiopia

References 

Populated places in Ethiopia